Chitungwiza North is a constituency of the National Assembly of the Parliament of Zimbabwe located in Harare Province. It covers part of Chitungwiza, a dormitory city of Harare. Its current MP since the 2018 election is Godfrey Sithole of the Movement for Democratic Change Alliance.

History 
In 2008, Fidelis Mhashu (MDC) was elected the MP for the constituency, defeating the ZANU-PF's Joyce Kunaka, MDC-Mutambara member Tamirira Shumba, and UPP member Martin Murapa.

Most recently, it was represented by Fidelis Mhashu until his death in 2018.

References 

Chitungwiza
Parliamentary constituencies in Zimbabwe